American Braille was a popular braille alphabet used in the United States before the adoption of standardized English Braille in 1918. It was developed by Joel W. Smith, a blind piano tuning teacher at Perkins Institution for the Blind in Boston, and introduced in 1878 as Modified Braille. In 1900 it was renamed American Braille.

Rather than ordering the letters numerically, as was done in French Braille and the (reordered) English Braille also used in the US at the time, in American Braille the letters were partially reassigned by frequency, with the most-common letters being written with the fewest dots. This significantly improved writing speed with the slate and stylus, which wrote one dot at a time, but lost its advantage with the braille typewriters that became practical after 1950.

American Braille was the alphabet used by Helen Keller.

Letters
In numerical order and with their modern French and English Braille equivalents, the letters are:

Not quite half of the letters retained their French Braille values.

Punctuation
Punctuation was as follows. Comma, semicolon, and parentheses were the same as in English Braille.

References

Sources
 

Frequency-based braille alphabets